Long Lake is a fresh water lake located in southwest Kalkaska County in the U.S. state of Michigan. The lake encompasses .

The lake has a maximum depth of  near the northern end. The boat launch has minimal roadside parking with a loose gravel surface that is only suitable for small to medium watercraft.

References

Lakes of Michigan
Lakes of Kalkaska County, Michigan